Environment Act may refer to:

Environment Effects Act 1978 in the Australian state of Victoria
Environment Act 1986 in New Zealand
Environment Act 1995 in the United Kingdom
Environment Act 2021 in the United Kingdom
Department of the Environment Act (Canada)

See also
Environmental Protection Act (disambiguation)
Environment (biophysical)